Novoselivka may refer to several places in Ukraine:

Cherkasy Oblast
Novoselivka, Cherkasy Raion, village in Cherkasy Raion

Chernihiv Oblast
Novoselivka, Chernihiv Raion, village in Chernihiv Raion
Novoselivka, Talalaivka Raion, village in Talalaivka Raion
Novoselivka, Novhorod-Siverskyi Raion, village in Novhorod-Siverskyi Raion
Novoselivka, Korukivka Raion, village in Korukivka Raion

Donetsk Oblast 

 Novoselivka, Kramatorsk Raion, village in Kramatorsk Raion

Odessa Oblast
Novoselivka, Ananyiv Raion, village in Ananyiv Raion
Novoselivka, Artsyz Raion, village in Artsyz Raion
Novoselivka, Beresivka Raion, village in Beresivka Raion
Novoselivka, Kiliya Raion, village in Kiliya Raion
Novoselivka, Liubashivka Raion, village in Liubashivka Raion
Novoselivka, Podilsk Raion, village in Podilsk Raion
Novoselivka, Rozdilna Raion, village in Rozdilna Raion
Novoselivka, Sarata Raion, village in Sarata Raion
Novoselivka, Tarutyne Raion, village in Tarutyne Raion
Novoselivka (Velyka Mykhailivka), Velyka Mykhailivka Raion, village in Velyka Mykhailivka village council, Velyka Mykhailivka Raion
Novoselivka (Vyshneve), Velyka Mykhailivka Raion, village in Vyshneve village council, Velyka Mykhailivka Raion

Poltava Oblast
Novoselivka, Hadiach Raion
Novoselivka, Hlobyne Raion
Novoselivka, Hrebinka Raion
Novoselivka, Kozelshchyna Raion
Novoselivka, Kremenchuk Raion
Novoselivka, Orzhytsia Raion
Novoselivka, Poltava Raion
Novoselivka, Zinkiv Raion

Rivne Oblast
Novoselivka, Rivne Oblast, village in Mlyniv Raion

Sumy Oblast
Novoselivka, Konotop Raion, village in Konotop Raion
Novoselivka, Lebedyn Raion, village in Lebedyn Raion
Novoselivka, Trostianets Raion, village in Trostianets Raion

Zaporizhzhia Oblast
Novoselivka, Orikhiv Raion, village in Orikhiv Raion
Novoselivka, Polohy Raion, village in Polohy Raion
Novoselivka, Vilniansk Raion, village in Vilniansk Raion